Two Plus Fours is a 1930 American short film directed by Ray McCarey and featuring the Rhythm Boys  (Bing Crosby, Al Rinker and Harry Barris). The film was shot in 5 days starting on May 29, 1930 at a cost of $19,689. It previewed in mid-June and was shipped early in July 1930.

Plot summary 
The Rhythm Boys are some of the students from Tait College who patronize a tailor named Ginsberg who is affectionately known as Ripstitch. The tailor hits financial problems and is threatened with eviction by a bullying landlord. He is eventually saved by the support of all the students led by the Rhythm Boys.

Cast 
Nat Carr as Ripstitch the Tailor
Thelma Hill as Mary Ginsberg - Max's Daughter
Harry Barris as Harry
Bing Crosby as Bing
Al Rinker as Al
Edgar Dearing as Rent Collector
Spec O'Donnell as Spec

Soundtrack 
 The Stein Song - sung by The Rhythm Boys on two occasions, the second of which is a parody.

References

External links 

1930 films
1930 musical films
American short films
American black-and-white films
American musical films
1930 short films
Films directed by Ray McCarey
1930s English-language films
1930s American films